The Land Conservancy of San Luis Obispo County (LCSLO) is a local nonprofit organization in California that has served San Luis Obispo (SLO) County since 1984. Through voluntary and collaborative efforts the LCSLO works to protect and enhance lands having important scenic, agricultural, habitat and cultural values for the benefit of people and wildlife.

Land acquisition, preservation and restoration 

The LCSLO objectives include:
Protect important conservation lands for future generations.
Restore degraded habitat resources to return their environmental benefits to the community.
Undertake the restoration and management of protected conservation lands.

Land Preservation and Restoration Projects 
The LCSLO has been and continues to be involved in many land preservation as well as creek and dune restoration projects in diverse areas around SLO county including the north coast, San Luis Obispo Creek, Guadalupe-Nipomo Dunes/Black Lake Canyon and in northern Santa Barbara County at Paradise Beach.

Examples of Restoration/Preservation Sites/Programs 

Monterey Pine Forest Protection Program. Since 1986, the LCSLO has purchased over 400 lots in Cambria, California with the specific aim of preserving one of three rare and endemic Monterey Pine forests along the Pacific Coast.
Hidden Springs Farm. The LCSLO worked with the Franks family of Atascadero to keep  of land intact and in the family estate. There were 18 legal lots, each a potential homesite. The LCSLO will continue to monitor the site for conservation purposes.
Greenbelt Protection Program. Overwhelming community support and over 200 individual donors helped preserve the quality of local natural areas. This preserved agricultural land in close proximity to downtown and protected the headwaters that feed into local tributaries of SLO Creek. Part of the funding was provided through the Department of Defense Army Compatible Use Buffer (ACUB) Program. The LCSCO received $350,000 toward the purchase of the Stenner Springs property.
Reservoir Canyon. An important streamside property, the project site contains a one-mile (1.6 km) stretch of upper San Luis Obispo creek on a working cattle ranch. The LCSLO took on the restoration of this site after heavy rains caused severe erosion problems. To restore the creek bank, limit erosion and stop sediment from filling the creek, deep shaded pools were created as habitat for steelhead trout (federally listed threatened species). To accomplish the restoration over 200 steelhead were caught and relocated before the work began.
Pismo Preserve, Pismo Beach, California. A 900-Acre Regional Park with over 15 miles of multi-use trails for hiking, cycling and horseback riding being created.

Conservation planning 
The Land Conservancy participated in numerous policy studies including the City of San Luis Obispo Greenbelt Plan, a Community Separator Study (2006), an analysis of antiquated subdivisions in rural areas (2007), and with the SLO County's Agricultural Land Conservation Program.

The LCSLO aims to: 
Help prevent poorly planned development.
Protect drinking water sources.
Promote family farmlands and ranches.
Hold conservation workshops for/with landowners and financial/estate planning experts.
Partner on developing landowner/rancher workshops with the University of California Cooperative Extension and other groups.

Current planning projects include:
Santa Rosa Creek Watershed Conservation Plan
San Luis Obispo Creek Fish Passage Improvement Program
San Luis Obispo Creek Watershed Enhancement Plan
City of San Luis Obispo Greenbelt Planning Project
Nipomo Creek Watershed Management Plan

Education and outreach projects 

The Land Conservancy operates a number of activities devoted to educating the public on water conservation, riparian protection, and oak habitat support. Activities are designed to:
Provide information about and access to outdoor areas to help San Luis Obispo community members develop a personal land ethic and connection to the land.
Provide meaningful volunteer opportunities for people to help them better understand the importance of land conservation/restoration while helping the Land Conservancy to achieve its goals.
Collaboration with Growing Grounds Farms. Clients in Growing Grounds Farm's horticultural therapy program (Transitions-Mental Health Association) visit conservation sites to collect and propagate specimens and plant seedlings. The participants recognize that their efforts have value and that these activities provide a special way for them to expand their knowledge and skills while contributing to community conservation efforts.

Land trusts in California
Protected areas of San Luis Obispo County, California